Lai Choy Heng is Professor of Physics and the former Executive Vice-President (Academic Affairs), Yale-NUS College (2012-2013) and Vice Provost (Academic Personnel) at the National University of Singapore (2003-2012). He received his undergraduate as well as graduate degrees from the University of Chicago. He took up a position as post-doctoral Research Fellow at the Niels Bohr Institute, University of Copenhagen from 1978 to 1980 after which he joined National University of Singapore’s (NUS) Department of Mathematics as a Lecturer. He then moved to the Department of Physics in 1981 which saw him rise through the ranks from Senior Lecturer to Associate Professor to Professor.

Academic career

To date, Lai has held several administrative appointments within the University. He was Head of the Departments of Computational Science (1996–97) and Physics (1998–2000) and was concurrently the Vice Dean of the Faculty of Science from 1996 to 2000. He became Dean from 2000 to 2003 and was appointed the University's Vice Provost (Academic Personnel) in June 2003. He is also, since September 2007, the Deputy Director of the Centre for Quantum Technologies, a Research Centre of Excellence in quantum information science and technology at NUS. Lai is also involved in the NUS NanoScience and NanoTechnology Initiative as the Chairman of its management board.

As Vice Provost (Academic Personnel), Lai chaired the University Promotion and Tenure Committee and works with the Provost in academic personnel matters, performance evaluation, benchmarking, university resources and space allocation. He oversaw the functions of the University's Centre for Information Technology, University Scholars Programme, The Logistics Institute-Asia Pacific, NUS-Fudan Joint Graduate School and the NUS NanoScience and NanoTechnology Initiative.

Research, Honours and Awards

Lai Choy Heng's current areas of research are nonlinear dynamical systems; quantum chaos; complex systems as well as quantum information and quantum computation. He is a Fellow of the Institute of Physics in Singapore, as well as member of the American Physical Society and the American Association of Physics Teachers. In 2002, the French Government conferred upon him the Chevalier dans l'Ordre des Palmes Academiques for his contributions to relations between the two countries within the academic field and he received the Public Administration Medal (Silver) from the Singapore Government in 2003.

References

External links
 Lai Choy Heng Personal Web Page
 National University of Singapore Management
 

Academic staff of the National University of Singapore
Living people
Chevaliers of the Ordre des Palmes Académiques
Recipients of the Pingat Pentadbiran Awam
Year of birth missing (living people)